Harold George Mulliner (18 September 1897 – 1 July 1946)  Archdeacon of Westmorland from 1944 until his death.

He was educated at Birkenhead School and held a Commission with the King's Liverpool Regiment and was wounded in France. When peace returned he completed his studies at Hertford College, Oxford and Ripon College Cuddesdon; and was ordained in 1925. He served curacies in Caversham, Garston and Southport. He was the Vicar of North Stainley from 1929 to 1937; Domestic Chaplain to the Bishop of Ripon from 1929 to 1935; and Residentiary Canon and Chancellor of Truro Cathedral from 1937 to 1944.

Notes

1897 births
People educated at Birkenhead School
King's Regiment (Liverpool) officers
Alumni of Hertford College, Oxford
Alumni of Ripon College Cuddesdon
Archdeacons of Westmorland
1946 deaths